Canadian National Railway facilities in Peel Region consists of two specialized facilities, which are both accessed using the CN Halton Subdivision.

Brampton Intermodal Terminal

Located at 76 Intermodal Drive, it is a major Intermodal terminal located between Airport Road and Goreway Drive in Brampton and bound to the north by Queen Street and Intermodal Drive to the south. The terminal is connected to MacMillan Yard to redirect intermodal freight cars.

The terminal is located next to Canadian Tire's Distribution Centre with the company being a major intermodal client.

Malport Freight Yard

Malport Yard is a smaller yard located in Mississauga south of Steeles Avenue between Airport Road and Torbram Road. It is located at milepoint 9.7 on the CN Halton Subdivision. The yard services CN's own intermodal units, as well perform local switcher or transfer cars to other trains. The yard is also connected with MacMillan Yard.

Located next to Malport is the Jet Fuel Rail Offloading, Storage and Distribution Facility. It was built at a cost of $59-65 million and opened on 21 July 2009. It is used to supply the Toronto Pearson International Airport with jet fuel. , CN transports the fuel to the facility from the Port of Quebec, as well as from a CN transload terminal in Flat Rock, Michigan. Before the facility's construction, fuel was trucked to the airport from CN's MacMillan Yard rather than being brought directly by rail. , the facility is owned by the Pearson International Fuel Facilities Corporation, which leases it out to the Toronto Fuel Committee (owned by a consortium of airlines), and is managed by FSM Management Group Inc. of Dorval, Quebec.

In 2016, CN and Emergency Response Assistance Canada (ERAC) conducted a full-scale emergency response exercise at Malport Yard around the handling of dangerous petroleum products in a rail yard setting.

See also

 CN Halton Subdivision
 MacMillan Yard

References

Canadian National Railway facilities in Ontario
Rail infrastructure in Peel Region
Rail infrastructure in Mississauga
Rail infrastructure in Brampton